Karen Holmsen (1832-1912) was a Norwegian opera singer. She is referred to as the perhaps first trained opera singer in Norway, and the first international opera star of her country.

References

1912 deaths
1832 births
19th-century Norwegian women opera singers